Patrik Andersson is a Swedish film producer, and head of development for B-Reel Films based in Stockholm.

Filmography
 Fanny, Alexander & jag, (2012)
 Hotell, (2013)
 A Living Soul, (short, 2014, executive)
 Foodies: The Cultural Jet Set, (2014)
 Welcome to Norway, (co-producer, 2014)
 A Serious Game, (2016)
 Euphoria, (2017)
 Midsommar, (2019)

References

Swedish film producers

Living people
Year of birth missing (living people)